Appointment in Liverpool is a 1988 Italian drama film co-written and directed by Marco Tullio Giordana.

Plot
Caterina is a twenty-year-old girl from Cremona: her father died before her eyes in Brussels, a victim of the Heysel Stadium disaster. A British police inspector, determined to bring to justice all those responsible, after several years summons her again as an eyewitness as new elements have emerged. Caterina recognizes the murderer, a Liverpool taxi driver, but she prefers to remain silent as to track down the man in his hometown and take her revenge.

Cast
 Isabella Ferrari as Caterina Dossena
 John Steiner as British Police Inspector
 Valeria Ciangottini as Anna, Caterina's mother
 Nigel Court as The Hooligan
  as Tiziana
 Marne Maitland as Pilar
 Vittorio Amandola as Italian Commissioner
 Ugo Conti as The Mechanic

References

External links

Appointment in Liverpool at Variety Distribution

1988 drama films
1988 films
Italian drama films
Films directed by Marco Tullio Giordana
Italian films about revenge
Hooliganism
Films set in the 1980s
Films set in Liverpool
1980s Italian films
1980s Italian-language films